Panteleimon  (old name:  Nea Santa)  is a village south of the city of Kilkis in the Kilkis regional unit, in northern Greece. It is part of the municipal unit Gallikos and has a population of 451 people (2011).

References 

Populated places in Kilkis (regional unit)